United Nations Security Council Resolution 403, adopted on January 14, 1977, after hearing representations from the Minister of External Affairs of Botswana, condemned attacks by the "illegal minority regime" in Southern Rhodesia. The resolution recalled previous resolutions on the topic, including the right to self-determination of the people of Southern Rhodesia.

The Council reaffirmed the legal responsibility of the Government of the United Kingdom over Southern Rhodesia, and demanded the latter cease all hostile acts. The resolution, noting the economic hardship caused by the attacks, requested all relevant agencies of the United Nations and other member states to assist in various projects in Botswana.

The resolution was adopted with 13 votes; the United Kingdom and United States abstained from voting.

See also
 List of United Nations Security Council Resolutions 401 to 500 (1976–1982)

References
Text of the Resolution at undocs.org

External links
 

 0403
1977 in Botswana
 0403
 0403
January 1977 events
Botswana–Rhodesia relations